The 2014–15 Rutgers Scarlet Knights men's basketball team represented Rutgers University during the 2014–15 NCAA Division I men's basketball season. The Scarlet Knights, led by second year head coach Eddie Jordan, played their home games at the Louis Brown Athletic Center, better known as The RAC, as first year members of the Big Ten Conference.

Previous season
They finished the season 12–21, 5–13 in AAC play to finish in seventh place. They advanced to the quarterfinals of the AAC tournament where they lost to Louisville.

Preseason

Departures

Incoming transfers

2014 signing class

Roster

Schedule

|-
! colspan="9" style="background:#c00; color:white;"| Exhibition

|-
! colspan="9" style="background:#c00; color:white;"| Non-conference regular season

|-
! colspan="9" style="background:#c00; color:white;"| Big Ten regular season

|-
! colspan="9" style="background:#c00; color:white;"|

See also
2014–15 Rutgers Scarlet Knights women's basketball team

References

Rutgers Scarlet Knights men's basketball seasons
Rutgers
2014 in sports in New Jersey
2015 in sports in New Jersey